"Someone Should Tell You" was the second single taken from British R&B singer Lemar's third album The Truth About Love.

Before the single's release, "Someone Should Tell You" followed the success of "It's Not That Easy" in the UK airplay charts by climbing into the top 10, peaking at #10. The single also entered the UK top 75 at #59 on downloads alone, a week before the song's physical release on 20 November 2006. "Someone Should Tell You" climbed to #21 on its  release and became Lemar's second single to miss the UK top 20, joint lowest with "Don't Give It Up" which also made #21 in 2005.

A vinyl release for "Someone Should Tell You" was intended but was later cancelled.

Track listings

 CD: 1

 "Someone Should Tell You"
 "Baby, I Love You"

 CD: 2

 "Someone Should Tell You"
 "Someone Should Tell You" (Kardinal Beats Remix)
 "If There's Any Justice" (Live)
 "All I Ever Do (My Boo)" (Live)

Credits & Personnel 
 Writer - Paul Barry  Steve Torch  Lemar Obika
 Producer - Brian Rawling  Paul Meehan
 Mixer - Steve Fitzmaurice

Charts

References

2006 singles
Lemar songs
Songs written by Lemar
Songs written by Paul Barry (songwriter)
Songs written by Steve Torch
Song recordings produced by Brian Rawling